The Mexico City Metrobús Line 1 is a bus rapid transit line in the Mexico City Metrobús. It operates between Indios Verdes, in the Gustavo A. Madero municipality in the northern part of the city, and El Caminero, in Tlalpan in southern Mexico City.
The line was the first one to be built and opened. The first section of the line, known as Corredor Insurgentes, was inaugurated by Andrés Manuel López Obrador, Head of Government of the Federal District from 2000 to 2005, on June 19, 2005. The second stretch of the line, known as Corredor Insurgentes Sur, was inaugurated on March 13, 2008, by Marcelo Ebrard, Head of Government of the Federal District from 2006 to 2012.

The line has 46 stations and a total length of 28.1 kilometers.

Service description

Services
The line has five itineraries.

Indios Verdes to Insurgentes
From Indios Verdes
First Bus: 5:30 (Monday-Friday)
Last Bus: 21:55 (Monday-Friday)
First Bus: 8:00 (Saturday)
Last Bus: 16:04 (Saturday)
No service on Sunday

To Indios Verdes
First Bus: 5:58 (Monday-Friday)
Last Bus: 22:23 (Monday-Friday)
First Bus: 8:24 (Saturday)
Last Bus: 16:27 (Saturday)
No service on Sunday

Indios Verdes to El Caminero
To El Caminero
First Bus: 4:30 (Monday-Wednesday)
Last Bus: 23:54 (Monday-Wednesday)
First Bus: 4:30 (Thursday-Friday)
Last Bus: 00:40 (Thursday-Friday)
First Bus: 4:30 (Saturday)
Last Bus: 00:40 (Saturday)
First Bus: 5:00 (Sunday)
Last Bus: 23:40 (Sunday)

To Indios Verdes
First Bus: 4:30 (Monday-Wednesday)
Last Bus: 23:35 (Monday-Wednesday)
First Bus: 4:30 (Thursday-Friday)
Last Bus: 00:40 (Thursday-Friday)
First Bus: 4:30 (Saturday)
Last Bus: 00:40 (Saturday)
First Bus: 5:00 (Sunday)
Last Bus: 23:50 (Sunday)

Indios Verdes to Dr. Gálvez
From Indios Verdes
First Bus: 5:00 (Monday-Friday)
Last Bus: 21:24 (Monday-Friday)
First Bus: 5:00 (Saturday)
Last Bus: 22:37 (Saturday)
First Bus: 5:08 (Sunday)
Last Bus: 23:02 (Sunday)

To Indios Verdes
First Bus: 4:37 (Monday-Friday)
Last Bus: 22:40 (Monday-Friday)
First Bus: 4:30 (Saturday)
Last Bus: 22:38 (Saturday)
First Bus: 5:03 (Sunday)
Last Bus: 22:40 (Sunday)

Buenavista to El Caminero
To El Caminero
First Bus: 5:30 (Monday-Friday)
Last Bus: 22:28 (Monday-Friday)
First Bus: 6:00 (Saturday)
Last Bus: 21:54 (Saturday)
First Bus: 6:20 (Sunday)
Last Bus: 21:54 (Sunday)

From El Caminero
First Bus: 5:01 (Monday-Friday)
Last Bus: 21:11 (Monday-Friday)
First Bus: 4:50 (Saturday)
Last Bus: 20:43 (Saturday)
First Bus: 5:34 (Sunday)
Last Bus: 20:38 (Sunday)

Colonia del Valle to Tepalcates (Line 2)
To Tepalcates
First Bus: 4:45 (Monday-Friday)
Last Bus: 22:55 (Monday-Friday)
First Bus: 4:50 (Saturday)
Last Bus: 23:43 (Saturday)
First Bus: 5:29 (Sunday)
Last Bus: 23:50 (Sunday)

To Colonia del Valle
First Bus: 4:35 (Monday-Friday)
Last Bus: 21:28 (Monday-Friday)
First Bus: 4:30 (Saturday)
Last Bus: 23:28 (Saturday)
First Bus: 5:05 (Sunday)
Last Bus: 23:39 (Sunday)

Line 1 services the Gustavo A. Madero, Cuauhtémoc, Benito Juárez, Álvaro Obregón, Coyoacán and Tlalpan municipalities.

Station list

{| class="wikitable"
|-
! width="150px" | Stations
! Connections
! Neighborhood(s) 
! Municipality
! Picture
! Date opened
|-
|  Indios Verdes
|
 : Line 3: Indios Verdes station
 : Line 7: Indios Verdes station
 : Line 1: Indios Verdes station
 Indios Verdes
  Line 3: Indios Verdes station
  Line IV: Indios Verdes station
 Line 2: Indios Verdes station (under construction)
 Routes: 101, 101-A, 101-B, 101-D, 102, 107-B (at distance), 108
| Residencial Zacatenco
| rowspan=5| Gustavo A. Madero
| 
| rowspan=36| June 19, 2005
|-
|  Deportivo 18 de Marzo
| 
  Line 6: Deportivo 18 de Marzo station
 Deportivo 18 de Marzo
  Line 3: Deportivo 18 de Marzo station
  Line 6: Deportivo 18 de Marzo station
 Route: 15-B
| Lindavista, Tepeyac Insurgentes
| 
|-
|  Euzkaro
| 
 Route: 15-A, 15-B
| Magdalena de las Salinas, Industrial
| 
|-
|  Potrero
|
 Potrero
  Line 3: Potrero station
 Routes: 25, 104
 Route: 15-C
| Capultitán, Guadalupe Insurgentes
| 
|-
|  La Raza
| 
  Line 3: La Raza station
 La Raza
  Line 3: La Raza station
  Line 5: La Raza station
  Line IV: La Raza station (under construction)
 Routes: 11-A (at distance), 12 (at distance), 23, 27-A, 103
 Line 1: La Raza stop (north–south route)
 Routes: 7-D (at distance), 20-C, 20-D
| Vallejo 
| 
|-
|  Circuito
|
  Line 3: Circuito station
 Route: 200
 Routes: 7-D (at distance), 20-A, 20-D
| Santa María Insurgentes
| rowspan=16| Cuauhtémoc
| 
|-
|  San Simón
| 
 Route: 20-B (at distance)
| Santa María Insurgentes, San Simón Tolnáhuac
| 
|-
|  Manuel González
| 
 Route: 10-B
| Colonia Atlampa, Tlatelolco
| 
|-
|  Buenavista
| 
  Line 3: Buenavista station
<li>  Line 4: Buenavista station
<li> Buenavista
<li> (at distance)
<li>  Line B: Buenavista station
<li> Line 1: Buenavista station
<li> Routes: 10-E, 11-C, 12-B
| rowspan=3| Santa María la Ribera, Buenavista
| 
|-
|  El Chopo
| 
<li> (at distance)
| 
|-
|  Revolución
|
<li> (at distance)
<li>  Line 2: Revolución station
<li> Routes: 12-B (at distance), 16-A, 16-B
| 
|-
|  Plaza de la República
|
  Line 4: Plaza de la República station
 (at distance)
 Route: 12-B
| rowspan=2| San Rafael, Tabacalera
| 
|-
|  Reforma
|
<li>  Line 7: Reforma station
<li>  Line 7: París station
<li> (at distance)
<li> Route: 19-H (at distance)
| 
|-
|  Hamburgo
|
<li>  Line 7:  Hamburgo station
<li>
| Juárez
| 
|-
|  Glorieta de los Insurgentes
|
<li>
<li>  Line 1: Insurgentes station
<li> Route: 34-A
<li> Routes: 18-C (at distance), 19-E, 19-F, 19-G, 19-H
| Juárez, Roma Norte
| 
|-
|  Durango
| 
<li>
<li> Routes: 19, 19-A
| rowspan=2| Roma Norte
| 
|-
|  Álvaro Obregón
| 
<li>
<li> Line 2: Insurgentes stop (east–west route)
| 
|-
|  Sonora
| 
<li>
<li> Routes: 19, 19-A
| Hipódromo, Roma Norte
| 
|-
|  Campeche
| 
<li>
| rowspan=3| Hipódromo, Roma Sur
| 
|-
|  Chilpancingo
|
<li>
<li>  Line 9: Chilpancingo station
<li> Routes: 9-C, 9-E
| 
|-
|  Nuevo León
|
<li>  Line 2: Nuevo León station
<li>
| 
|-
|  La Piedad
| 
<li>
| rowspan=2| Nápoles, Del Valle Norte
| rowspan=9| Benito Juárez
| 
|-
|  Poliforum
| 
<li>
| 
|-
|  Nápoles
| 
<li>
| Nápoles, Del Valle Centro
| 
|-
|  Colonia del Valle
| 
<li>
| Nápoles, Insurgentes San Borja
| 
|-
|  Ciudad de los Deportes
| 
<li>
| Ciudad de los Deportes, Insurgentes San Borja
| 
|-
|  Parque Hundido
| 
<li>
| Noche Buena, Tlacoquemécatl
| 
|-
|  Félix Cuevas
|
<li>
<li>  Line 12: Insurgentes Sur station
<li> Insurgentes Sur stop (temporary Line 12 service)
<li> Line 3: Insurgentes Sur stop
<li> Route: 6-A (at distance)
| Extremadura Insurgentes, Tlacoquemécatl
| 
|-
|  Río Churubusco
| 
<li> Routes: 1-D, 120, 121-A, 200
<li> Route: 22-A
| Insurgentes Mixcoac, Actipán
| 
|-
|  Teatro Insurgentes
| 
| San José Insurgentes, Crédito Constructor
| 
|-
|  José María Velasco
| 
<li> Route: 6-A
| rowspan=4| Guadalupe Inn, Florida
| rowspan=6| Álvaro Obregón
| 
|-
|  Francia
| 
| 
|-
|  Olivo
| 
| 
|-
|  Altavista
| 
<li> Route: 116-A
| 
|-
|  La Bombilla
| 
<li> Routes: 21-D (at distance), 34-B
| San Ángel, Chimalistac
| 
|-
|  Dr. Gálvez
| 
<li> Routes: 13-A, 21-D (at distance), 34-B, 125, 128

| Barrio Loreto, Chimalistac
| 
|-
|  Ciudad Universitaria
| 
<li> Line 7: Ciudad Universitaria stop (north–south route)
| rowspan=2| Ciudad Universitaria
| rowspan=3| Coyoacán
| 
| rowspan=10| March 13, 2008
|-
|  Centro Cultural Universitario
| 
| 
|-
|  Perisur
|
<li> Route: 57-A
| Insurgentes Cuicuilco
| 
|-
|  Villa Olímpica
| 
| Villa Olímpica, Peña Pobre
| rowspan=7| Tlalpan
| 
|-
|  Corregidora
| 
| Tlalpan, La Lonja
| 
|-
|  Ayuntamiento
| 
| Tlalpan, La Fama
| 
|-
|  Fuentes Brotantes
| 
| rowspan=3| Santa Úrsula Xitla, Tlalpan
| 
|-
|  Santa Úrsula
| 
| 
|-
|  La Joya
| 
| 
|-
|  El Caminero
| 
<li> Routes: 2-A, 17-E, 17-F, 69, 111-A, 131, 132, 134, 134-A, 134-B, 134-C, 134-D
| La Joya
| 
|-
|}

Notes

Operators
Line 1 has four operators.

Corredor Insurgentes, SA de CV (CISA)
Vanguardia y Cambio, SA de CV (VYC)
Rey Cuauhtémoc, SA de CV (RECSA)
Red de Transporte de Pasajeros del Distrito Federal (RTP)

Ridership
As of April 2018, the Metrobus Line 1 moves an average of 600,000 commuters daily. This has led to a saturation of the line, thus articulated buses are being substituted for bi-articulated buses.

Incidents
According to the director of CISA, there are between one and four minor accidents per week in Line 1.

In February 2018, a cyclist was hit by a bus when he invaded the Metrobús' right-of-way near Perisur. The cyclist died immediately after the incident.

Notes

References

2005 establishments in Mexico
Bus rapid transit in Mexico
1